Methanediol, also known as formaldehyde monohydrate or methylene glycol, is an organic compound with chemical formula . It is the simplest geminal diol. In aqueous solutions it coexists with oligomers (short polymers). The compound is closely related and convertible to the industrially significant derivatives paraformaldehyde, formaldehyde, and 1,3,5-trioxane.

Methanediol is a product of the hydration of formaldehyde. The equilibrium constant for hydration is estimated to be 103, predominates in dilute (<0.1%) solution.

Occurrence
The dianion, methanediolate, is believed to be an intermediate in the crossed Cannizzaro reaction.

Gaseous methanediols can be generated by electron irradiation and sublimation of a mixture of methanol and oxygen ices.

Methanediol is believed to occur as an intermediate in the decomposition of carbonyl compounds in the atmosphere, and as a product of ozonolysis on these compounds.

Safety
Methanediol, rather than formaldehyde, is listed as one of the main ingredients of "Brazilian blowout", a hair-straightening formula marketed in the United States. The equilibrium with formaldehyde has caused concern since formaldehyde in hair straighteners is a health hazard, but the risk has been disputed.

See also
 Orthoformic acid (methanetriol)
 Orthocarbonic acid (methanetetrol)

References

Hydrates
Carbohydrates
Geminal diols
Sugar alcohols